The European Symposium on Programming (ESOP) is an annual conference devoted to fundamental issues in the specification, design, analysis, and implementation of programming languages and systems.

 According to CORE Ranking, ESOP has rank A (i.e. "excellent conference, and highly respected in a discipline area", top 14%). 
 According to Google Scholar Metrics (as of 20 July 2019), ESOP has H5-index 26 and H5-median 38.

Initially a biannual conference, ESOP moved in 1998 into an annual schedule and became one of the founding conferences of the European Joint Conferences on Theory and Practice of Software (ETAPS).

See also
 List of computer science conferences
 List of computer science conference acronyms
 List of publications in computer science
 Outline of computer science

References

Further reading 
 Special issue of Theoretical Computer Science on the European Symposium on Programming
 Special issue of ACM Transactions on Programming Languages and Systems on the European Symposium on Programming
 Special issue of Science of Computer Programming on the European Symposium on Programming

External links 
 
 ESOP Conferences at DBLP
 ESOP Conferences at SpringerLink

Computer science conferences
Programming languages conferences